Diao Linyu (born 7 April 1994) is a Chinese indoor volleyball player. She is a member of China women's national volleyball team. She participated at the 2017 Volleyball World Grand Prix, 2018 Montreux Volley Masters, 2019 Montreux Volley Masters, and 2018 FIVB Women's World Championship.

On club level, she plays for Jiangsu Zenith Steel.

References

External links 
 interview

Sportspeople from Huai'an
Volleyball players from Jiangsu
Chinese women's volleyball players
1994 births
Living people
Setters (volleyball)
Asian Games gold medalists for China
Asian Games medalists in volleyball
Medalists at the 2018 Asian Games
Volleyball players at the 2018 Asian Games
21st-century Chinese women